This article contains information about the literary events and publications of 1820.

Events
January 16 – Poems Descriptive of Rural Life and Scenery by "Northamptonshire peasant poet" John Clare is published in England by John Taylor.
April 22 – Walter Scott is created 1st baronet of Abbotsford in the County of Roxburgh in the Baronetage of the United Kingdom.
September – Poet John Keats, suffering from tuberculosis, leaves London to take up residence in the house on the Spanish Steps in Rome where he will die in 1821.
November 20 – An 80-ton sperm whale attacks the Essex, a whaleship from Nantucket, Massachusetts, 2,000 miles off the western coast of South America. Herman Melville's 1851 novel Moby-Dick is in part inspired by this story.
unknown dates
More than 20 years after the poet's death, Robert Chambers edits and publishes The Songs of Robert Burns.
Thomas Kendall has the first book printed in the Māori language, A korao no New Zealand; or, the New Zealander's first book; being an attempt to compose some lessons for the instruction of the natives, published in Sydney, Australia.
The first translation of the Old English epic poem Beowulf into a modern language, Danish, Bjovulfs Drape, by N. F. S. Grundtvig, is published.
The Cambridge Apostles, an intellectual discussion group, is established at the University of Cambridge in England.

New books

Fiction
James Fenimore Cooper – Precaution
Thomas Gaspey – Forty Years Ago
Robert Huish – Castle of Nielo
Francis Lathom – Italian Mysteries
Charles Maturin (anonymously) – Melmoth the Wanderer
Regina Marie Roche – The Munster Cottage Boy
Sir Walter Scott (anonymously)
Ivanhoe (published 1819, dated 1820)
The Abbot
The Monastery
Louisa Stanhope – The Crusaders
Rosalia St. Clair – The Highland Castle, and the Lowland Cottage

Children
Maria Hack
English Stories, illustrating some of the most interesting events and characters between the Accession of Alfred and the Death of John
English Stories. Second series, between the Accession of Henry the Third and the Death of Henry the Sixth
Mary Shelley – Maurice, or the Fisher's Cot (written 1820 then lost, published 1997)

Drama
 James Sheridan Knowles – Virginius
William Thomas Moncrieff – The Lear of Private Life
Percy Bysshe Shelley – Prometheus Unbound

Poetry
Robert Burns (died 1796) – The Songs of Robert Burns
John Clare – Poems Descriptive of Rural Life and Scenery
John Keats
The Eve of St. Agnes
Lamia and Other Poems
Alphonse de Lamartine – Méditations poétiques
Adam Mickiewicz – Ode to Youth (Oda do młodości)
Nguyễn Du – The Tale of Kieu (斷腸新聲, Truyện Kiều)
Aleksandr Pushkin – Ruslan and Ludmila (Руслан и Людмила)
Percy Bysshe Shelley – To a Skylark

Non-fiction
Thomas Brown – Lectures on the Philosophy of the Human Mind
Howard Douglas – A Treatise on Naval Gunnery
Georg Wilhelm Friedrich Hegel – Elements of the Philosophy of Right
John George Hoffman – Pow-Wows; or, Long Lost Friend
Claude François Lallemand – Recherches anatomico-pathologiques sur l'encéphale et ses dépendances (to 1832)
Charles Lamb – Essays of Elia
Thomas Malthus – Principles of Political Economy
Charles Mills – History of the Crusades for the Recovery and Possession of the Holy Land
Robert Southey – Life of Wesley
Mariana Starke – Travels on the Continent: written for the use and particular information of travellers

Births
January 17 – Anne Brontë, English novelist and poet (died 1849)
January 30 – Concepción Arenal, Spanish feminist writer and activist (died 1893)
February 28 – John Tenniel, English illustrator and cartoonist (died 1914)
March 2 – Multatuli (Eduard Douwes Dekker), Dutch writer (died 1887)
March 17 – Jean Ingelow, English poet and novelist (died 1897)
March 30 – Anna Sewell, English novelist (died 1878)
April 4 – Mkrtich Khrimian, Armenian Catholicos, essayist and poet (died 1907)
April 16 – Charlotte A. Jerauld, American poet and story writer (died 1845)
April 26 – Alice Cary, American poet and short-story writer (died 1871)
April 27 – Herbert Spencer, English philosopher (died 1903)
June 21 – James Halliwell-Phillipps, English bibliophile (died 1889)
August 13 – Sir George Grove, English writer and lexicographer on music (died 1900)
September 2 – Lucretia Peabody Hale, American journalist and author (died 1900)
September 17 – Émile Augier, French dramatist (died 1889)
October 14 – John Harris, English poet (died 1884)
November 23 (December 5 N.S.) – Afanasy Fet, Russian lyric poet, essayist and short-story writer (died 1892)
November 28 – Friedrich Engels, German socialist writer (died 1895)

Deaths
February 5 – William Drennan, Irish poet, radical and educationalist (born 1754)
February 23 – Alojzy Feliński, Polish poet (born 1771)
March 20 – Eaton Stannard Barrett, Irish satirical poet and novelist (born 1786)
April 2 – Thomas Brown, Scottish philosopher and poet (born 1778)
May 1 – Richmal Mangnall, English schoolbook writer (born 1769)
July 16 – William Hazlitt Sr., Irish writer, radical and Unitarian minister, father of William Hazlitt (born 1737)
August 23 – Michel de Cubières, French poet, dramatist and historian (born 1752)
September 16 – Nguyễn Du, Vietnamese poet (born 1766)
October 5 – Augustin Barruel, French Jesuit priest and writer (born 1741)
November 8 – Lavinia Stoddard, American poet and educationist (born 1787)
November 12 – William Hayley, English poet and biographer (born 1745)

References

 
Years of the 19th century in literature